Barney Elliott Warren was an American Christian hymnwriter and minister. He was born in Lewiston, New York on February 20, 1867. In 1884, during a revival meeting at Grand Junction near Bangor, Michigan, he converted to the Church of God of Anderson, Indiana. Two years later, he joined Daniel Sidney Warner as a bass in his company of singers. He married Nannie Kigar, another member of that company. He served as minister and pastor to several congregations. From 1888 to 1940, he worked on song books and hymnals for the Gospel Trumpet Company, the publishing arm of that Church of God. He died on April 21, 1951 in Springfield, Ohio, and is buried in Vale Cemetery there. He has been credited with writing either the words or the music or both for more than 2000 hymns and children's songs; but , almost all have fallen out of fashion, though a number of Church of God congregations still sing them weekly. Together with Daniel Sidney Warner he published in 1893 the hymnal Echoes from Glory,

Songs 

 "It is Truly Wonderful", 1897
 "Joy Unspeakable"
 "Lost Forever", 1893
 "Under His Wings", 1897
 "Farther Along", 1911 (arranged)
 "There Is Joy In The Lord",1900

References

External links 
 
 
 
 

1867 births
1951 deaths
People from Lewiston, New York
American Christian hymnwriters
American Protestant ministers and clergy